Sidney Murray Matheson (1 July 1912 – 25 April 1985) was a U.S.-based Australian actor. He appeared on stage and in films and television programs until 1983.

Biography
Matheson was born in Casterton, Australia in 1912 where he grew up on a 3,000-acre sheep station. When he was 12, he saw a production of Sally by a touring company, and that experience sparked his desire to be an actor.

His first principal stage performance was in the musical Roberta at Her Majesty's Theatre, Melbourne, Australia in 1934. His London debut was at the Palladium in Band Waggon (1939).

He made his New York debut as Captain Worthy in The Relapse, as part of the Theatre Guild (1950). Matheson performed in dozens of plays, including some major tours, until 1982.

Matheson's first film appearance was as Joe Lawson in The Way to the Stars, a.k.a. Johnny in the Clouds (1945). He played the clown in the classic The Twilight Zone episode "Five Characters in Search of an Exit". He made guest appearances in two 1964 episodes of CBS's Perry Mason: once as B.K. Doran in "The Case of the Accosted Accountant", and once as Howard Hopkins in "The Case of the Wooden Nickels".

Some of his best-known film and television roles include:
 Felix Mulholland in the NBC Banacek series
 Benjamin Ovington in the movie How to Succeed in Business Without Really Trying (1967)
 The Clown in the Twilight Zone episode "Five Characters in Search of an Exit"
 Mr. Agee in the "Kick the Can" segment of The Twilight Zone: The Movie (1983)
 Dr. John Keith in the film Love Is a Many-Splendored Thing (1955)
 Talbot in the "Why Wait Until Uncle Kevin Dies" episode of Hawaii Five-O (1973) Season 6, episode 8.

In 1960 Matheson appeared as Alexander on the TV western Laramie on the episode titled "Duel at Parkinson Town." In 1960–61, he was cast as Geoffrey Carey in "The Archer's Ring" and as the High Priest in "The Perils of Penrose", respectively, on the ABC series, Adventures in Paradise, starring Gardner McKay. In 1961, he played the lead guest-starring role in the episode "A Rope for Charlie Munday" on another ABC adventure series, The Islanders, co-starring William Reynolds. In 1969, he guest starred in Bewitched season 5 episode 28, " Samantha's Good News". In 1970, he appeared in an episode of the ABC crime drama The Silent Force, and in 1978 he appeared in the "Murder! Murder!" episode of the NBC crime drama The Eddie Capra Mysteries. In 1982 he made an appearance on The Facts of Life S4 E11.

Matheson's ashes were scattered into the Pacific Ocean.

Filmography

Notes

Sources

 Biography at FilmReference.com

External links
 
 
 

1912 births
1985 deaths
Australian male film actors
Australian male stage actors
Australian male television actors
20th-century Australian male actors
Australian emigrants to the United States